Vykintas Slivka (born 29 April 1995) is a Lithuanian professional footballer who plays as a midfielder for Greek Super League club Lamia and the Lithuania national team.

Club career
Slivka signed for Italian club Juventus in 2014. He was loaned to Modena, Gorica, Den Bosch and Ascoli over the next three seasons.

He left Juventus in July 2017, signing a three-year contract with Hibernian. He scored his first goal for Hibernian on 12 August, in a 3–2 win against Rangers. Slivka missed over two months of the 2017–18 season due to a hamstring injury. In his first appearance after the injury, Slivka scored the second goal for Hibs in a 2–1 win against Celtic. During the following season Slivka maintained an unusual streak of only scoring goals for Hibs against either half of the Old Firm, scoring in the first minute of a 2–0 win at home to Celtic. Slivka was one of three first team players released by Hibs at the end of the 2019–20 season.

On 31 August 2020, Slivka signed for Super League Greece club Apollon Smyrnis.

International career
On 5 June 2015, Slivka made his debut for Lithuania in a friendly match against Hungary. During 2018 FIFA World Cup qualification, Slivka scored goals against Slovenia and Malta.

Career statistics

Club

International appearances

International goals
Scores and results list Lithuania's goal tally first.

Honours

Club
Juventus F.C.: Serie A 2013–14

Notes

References

External links
 

1995 births
Living people
Lithuanian footballers
Lithuanian expatriate footballers
Lithuania international footballers
FK Ekranas players
Juventus F.C. players
Modena F.C. players
ND Gorica players
FC Den Bosch players
Ascoli Calcio 1898 F.C. players
Slovenian PrvaLiga players
Eerste Divisie players
Serie B players
Expatriate footballers in Italy
Lithuanian expatriate sportspeople in Italy
Expatriate footballers in Slovenia
Lithuanian expatriate sportspeople in Slovenia
Expatriate footballers in the Netherlands
Lithuanian expatriate sportspeople in the Netherlands
Hibernian F.C. players
Lithuanian expatriate sportspeople in Scotland
Expatriate footballers in Scotland
Scottish Professional Football League players
Association football midfielders
Apollon Smyrnis F.C. players
PAS Lamia 1964 players
Lithuanian expatriate sportspeople in Greece
Expatriate footballers in Greece
Super League Greece players